Clara Vale is a village situated on the south bank of the River Tyne in Tyne and Wear, England. Once an independent village in County Durham it became incorporated into the new metropolitan county of Tyne and Wear in 1974 as part of the Metropolitan Borough of Gateshead.

Location
Clara Vale stands on the south bank of the River Tyne in a low-lying and quite secluded spot. Crawcrook borders the hamlet to the south. To the north, across the river, is the village of Wylam in Northumberland. It is notable for being the first settlement in Tyne and Wear that the river Tyne reaches and passes after leaving Northumberland.

Politics
In local government, Clara Vale is located in the 'Crawcrook, Greenside and Clara Vale ward' of Gateshead Council. The ward is at the far west of Gateshead and borders part of Northumberland. The ward is served by three councillors (three Labour).   Gateshead Council is Labour controlled.   
   
Clara Vale is located within the parliamentary constituency of Blaydon. Its current MP is Labour's Liz Twist.

History
Before the colliery and village were developed, a water-driven corn mill called Crawcrook Mill stood near the centre of the current village.
   
Clara Vale was built as a colliery community at the time the coal mine was opened in July 1893. Both pit and housing were purpose built by the Stella Coal Company. The mine closed down in February 1966, around the same time as many other nearby pits such as Emma, Greenside and Stargate.

The colliery and settlement were named after the wife of colliery owner John Bell Simpson, Clara was Atkinson (née Draper). There are early references to Claraville  and some old maps refer to the village as Claravale.

Modern-day Clara Vale
There is very little in the way of modern housing, only the one terraced street, built in the traditional style of the village. Of the other non-pit housing and buildings, there is only the chapel and former school (now a community centre). There are no local shops.   
   
By avoiding the suburbanisation experienced by nearby towns and villages such as Crawcrook, Greenside and Ryton. Clara Vale has retained its rural character completely. Farms and countryside surrounds the village. This includes a local nature reserve which stands at the site of the old colliery.   
  
Due to its small size, Clara Vale has limited amenities and local services. However, nearby Crawcrook and Ryton offer a range of shops and services and both of these are within walking distance of the village so whilst Clara Vale remains secluded, it is by no means isolated. Clara Vale does, however, have three nearby golf courses. Ryton golf course, in Clara Vale itself; Tyneside golf club in Ryton and, over the river to the north, Close House golf club in Wylam.   
   
The village also has a recreation ground, originally provided by the pit owners for the miners' welfare. The recreation ground has a football pitch and a cricket pitch with pavilion. Clara Vale Cricket Club play matches at the recreation ground on Saturdays during the Summer, with Ovingham Bridge End Cricket Club playing on some Sundays and Merz and McLellan Cricket Club on some Wednesday evenings. Clara Vale FC junior teams also play on the pitch at the Recreation Ground. Clara Vale Local Nature Reserve is located next to the recreation ground.

References

External links

An aerial view of the village, provided by Google Maps.   
A website giving information on the former pit villages of County Durham, this section concerns Clara Vale.   
The website for Clara Vale Cricket Club   
Clara Vale cricketer in club v country dilemma   
The website for Clara Vale Football Club     
Clara Vale online via Facebook

Villages in Tyne and Wear
Local Nature Reserves in Tyne and Wear
Ryton, Tyne and Wear